Birthana is a genus of moths in the family Immidae.

Species
 Birthana aristopa (Meyrick, 1925)
 Birthana asmenopa (Meyrick, 1925)
 Birthana aurantiaca (Semper, 1899)
 Birthana basiflava (Semper, 1899)
 Birthana bicolor (Hulstaert, 1924)
 Birthana cleis (Felder & Rogenhofer, 1875)
 Birthana consocia Walker, [1865]
 Birthana loxopis (Meyrick, 1909)
 Birthana saturata (Walker, 1864)
 Birthana taiwana Heppner, 1990

Former species
 Birthana acribes (Durrant, 1916)
 Birthana caelestis (Meyrick, 1906)
 Birthana pulchella (Schultze, 1910)

References

Immidae
Moth genera